Intercontinental Cup may refer to:
 Beach Soccer Intercontinental Cup, in Dubai, the United Arab Emirates
 FIBA Intercontinental Cup, a basketball competition between each of the European Cup winners from each of the European nations cup competition winners
 FIRS Intercontinental Cup, a roller hockey competition between the winners of the CERH European League and the CSP South American Club Championship
 ICC Intercontinental Cup, a first-class cricket competition run by the International Cricket Council for 12 of its associate members
 Intercontinental Cup (baseball), a former baseball competition sanctioned by the International Baseball Federation
 Intercontinental Cup (football), an association football competition organized jointly by UEFA and CONMEBOL
 Under-20 Intercontinental Cup, an association football youth competition organized jointly by UEFA and CONMEBOL
 Intercontinental Cup (India), the replacement for the Nehru Cup, a friendly association football tournament played in India
 Intercontinental Cup (skeleton), the intermediate-level tour in skeleton racing sanctioned by the International Bobsleigh and Skeleton Federation
 Intercontinental Futsal Cup, the international club championships for futsal
 Intercontinental Le Mans Cup, a sports car racing competition organized by the Automobile Club de l'Ouest

See also
Continental Cup (disambiguation)